Micheál Mac Liammóir (born Alfred Willmore; 25 October 1899 – 6 March 1978) was an actor, designer, dramatist, writer and impresario in 20th-century Ireland. Though born in London to an English family with no Irish connections, he emigrated to Ireland in early adulthood, changed his name, invented an Irish ancestry, and remained based there for the rest of his life, successfully maintaining a fabricated identity as a native Irishman born in Cork.

With his partner, Hilton Edwards, and two others, Mac Liammóir founded the Gate Theatre in Dublin, and became one of the most recognisable figures in the arts in twentieth-century Ireland. As well as acting at the Gate and internationally, he designed numerous productions, wrote eleven plays, and published stories, verse and travel books in Irish and English. He wrote and appeared in three one-man shows, of which The Importance of Being Oscar (1960) was the most celebrated, achieving more than 1,300 performances.

Life and career

Early years

Mac Liammóir was born Alfred Lee Willmore, in Willesden, in north-west London, into a family with no Irish connections. He was the youngest child and only son of Alfred George Willmore (1863–1934), a forage buyer for the firm of Whitney's of Bayswater, and his wife, Mary, née Lee (1867–1918). He attended primary school in Willesden and then attended a children's theatre academy run by Lila Field. He became a professional actor at the age of twelve; his sister Marjorie took charge of his general education and was his chaperone on tours that included visits to venues in Ireland as well as Britain. He made his debut as 1911, as King Goldfish in Field's play The Goldfish, alongside another child actor, Noël Coward. He later said, "I learned from Lila Field the absolute ABC of getting on and off the stage without disgracing oneself; I learned what a cue meant, what a stick of greasepaint was, the elements of timing, and that ghastly thing, the exploitation of childish charm". In September of that year he first worked for Sir Herbert Tree, playing Macduff's son in Macbeth. From Tree he quickly learned "a rude lesson" that charm was not enough: "I think it was Tree who first awoke the actor's imagination in me and made me feel the terror of the Witches' Coven and the horror of the ghost-haunted banquet".

In the Christmas season of 1911 he played Michael Darling in Peter Pan, and in June 1912, he played Oliver Twist in Tree's revival of the stage version of the novel. After two further child roles, and appearances in four silent films (now lost) he temporarily abandoned acting. After a summer in Spain, visiting his grandparents and becoming fluent in Spanish,  he studied painting at Willesden Polytechnic and then the Slade School of Art in 1915–16.

With a fellow student, Mary O'Keefe, he attended Irish language classes at the Ludgate Circus branch of the Gaelic League; the biographer Christopher Fitz-Simon thinks it probable that they saw plays by W. B. Yeats, Lady Gregory and J. M. Synge during the visits of the Abbey Theatre company in this period. Both students developed a keen interest in the Irish Literary Revival.

Move to Ireland
Mac Liammóir, now calling himself "Michael Willmore", made a brief return to the stage in February 1917, in Felix Gets a Month, a "whimsical comedy" at the Haymarket Theatre. The following month he went with O'Keefe and her mother to Ireland, the former having contracted tuberculosis and been prescribed "fresh air", the latter anxious to escape Zeppelin raids. Fitz-Simon suggests that Mac Liammóir's motive was to escape conscription into the army in the latter stages of the First World War.

In Ireland Mac Liammóir earned a modest living as a freelance illustrator for newspapers and books, acted from time to time, and designed for the Irish Theatre and Dublin Drama League. He assimilated himself into Irish culture and politics. He campaigned for Sinn Féin in the 1918 General Election, published his first book, a collection of stories in Irish, in 1922, and continued to write verse and prose in Irish and English. He experimented with various gaelicised versions of his name, including "Mac Uaimmhóir" and "Mac Liaimmhóir". He built up a fictitious identity as a native Irishman born in Cork.

During most of the 1920s Mac Liammóir continued to live with the O'Keefes. In search of a healthy environment for Mary they moved between Switzerland and the French riviera. He exhibited successfully in local galleries and, in 1923, at the Leigh Gallery in London. He later wrote a book of recollections – in Irish – about his travels. In 1925 he starred in a  silent film, Land of Her Fathers with a cast of mainly Abbey Theatre players.

Mary O'Keefe died in 1927 and Mac Liammóir, now known by that name, returned to the theatre. His sister Marjorie had married the actor-manager Anew McMaster whose touring company Mac Liammóir joined, playing Shakespearean roles including Bassanio in The Merchant of Venice, Laertes in Hamlet and Cassio in Othello. While on tour in the south of Ireland, he met another young English actor, Hilton Edwards, who was to become his lifelong partner, both personal and professional. Mac Liammóir and Edwards decided to settle in Dublin, with the intention of setting up their own theatre there.

Gate Theatre

In 1928 Mac Liammóir wrote, directed, designed and starred in Diarmuid and Gráinne for the opening of the Irish language theatre, An Taibhdhearc, in Galway. He subsequently produced twenty plays there.

Also in 1928, Mac Liammóir was one of the four founders of the Gate Theatre Studio, later simply the Gate Theatre, alongside Hilton Edwards, Daisy Bannard Cogley, and Gearóid Ó Lochlainn. Mac Liammóir and Edwards had been considering theatrical plans for Dublin, while Bannard Cogley (a friend of Mac Liammóir) and Ó Lochlainn had been discussing finding a more permanent theatre space, and they met, along with some mutual friends, in Bannard Cogley's club at 7 Harcourt Street, in spring 1928.  After further meetings, the quartet rented the Peacock Theatre and launched the Gate Theatre Studio there on 14 October 1928. The theatre studio spent its early years at the 102-seat Peacock Theatre and opened with a production of Peer Gynt, and Mac Liammóir subsequently acted in and designed nearly 300 productions at the Peacock and, after the company gained its own home in 1930, on Cavendish Row, at the Gate. He appeared in a wide range of plays, from Shakespeare (Romeo and Othello) to Ibsen (Oswald in Ghosts and the title role in Brand) and Eugene O'Neill (Orin in Mourning Becomes Electra), as well as lighter pieces. Over the next fifty years the Gate Theatre company presented a programme of new or experimental plays by Wilde, Shaw, Coward and many others.  Mac Liammóir and Edwards fostered the careers of new Irish dramatists such as Denis Johnston and rising young actors including Orson Welles.

Mac Liammóir returned to the West End in 1935, with the Gate company. The theatrical paper The Era rated his Hamlet one of the best in recent years: "charged with force, intelligence, humanity and dramatic certainty … a dominating and moving piece of acting", and said that the Gate company "looks like putting the Abbey in the shade". The  cosmopolitan atmosphere of Mac Liammóir and Edwards' Gate Theatre was contrasted with the earnest Celticism of the Abbey, and the two Dublin theatres were affectionately dubbed "Sodom and Begorrah".

Wartime and later years
Mac Liammóir remained based in Ireland during the Second World War. In the post-war years he returned to the West End in his own play Ill Met by Moonlight. The Stage thought the piece "too obscure and too discursive", but praised the performances of  Mac Liammóir, Edwards and their supporting cast. The following year the company played a short season on Broadway – Mac Liammóir's début there – giving his Where Stars Walk, Johnston's The Old Lady Says No!, and Shaw's  John Bull's Other Island. In 1951 he played Iago to Welles's Othello in the latter's film adaptation. In his early fifties he was unusually old for the role, but Welles wanted Iago played as an older, impotent man consumed by envy of the younger Othello. Mac Liammóir returned to the role onstage at the Dublin Festival in 1962 opposite William Marshall in the title role.

In 1954 Mac Liammóir returned to London, playing Brack in Hedda Gabler with Peggy Ashcroft as Hedda. In the role he was judged to be both sinister and amusing. Most of his work continued to be at the Gate, but in 1959 he returned to New York to play Don Pedro in Much Ado About Nothing, with John Gielgud as Benedick and Margaret Leighton as Beatrice.

Mac Liammóir's biggest theatrical success came in 1960, with his one-man show The Importance of Being Oscar, which won enthusiastic reviews and did well at the box office. It opened at the Gate, after which he played it on Broadway, in London and on tour around the world. He appeared in the piece more than 1,300 times between 1960 and 1975. He followed this in May 1963 with a new one-man entertainment I Must Be Talking to My Friends, and in 1970 presented a third, Talking About Yeats. Also in 1963 he had a key role as the ironic, mocking, unseen narrator of the multi-Oscar-winning Tom Jones.

In his later years Mac Liammóir relaxed his insistence on his fictitious origins and admitted the truth to interviewers, but for many years after his death reference books nonetheless continued to record him as a native of Cork. Despite Ireland's anti-gay laws, not repealed in their lifetimes, Edwards' and Mac Liammóir's relationship gained wide acceptance. The writer Éibhear Walshe has described them as Ireland's only publicly acknowledged homosexuals. They were jointly created freemen of the city of Dublin in 1973, the first theatre people to be thus honoured. Before that, MacLiammóir had received the Lady Gregory Medal for literature in 1960 and an honorary doctorate from Trinity College in 1963.

MacLiammóir made his final stage performance at the Gate in 1975 in The Importance of Being Oscar. He died at his and Edwards's Dublin home, 4 Harcourt Terrace, on 6 March 1978. Walshe records, "as a measure of the public acceptance of the MacLiammóir–Edwards partnership, the president of Ireland attended Micheál's funeral, two days later, at St Fintan's, Howth, Dublin, and paid his respects to Hilton Edwards as chief mourner".

Legacy

Plays
In his Who's Who in the Theatre entry, Mac Liammóir listed ten plays of which he was the author, as well as the three one-man shows, and an unspecified number of adaptations ("Jane Eyre, The Picture of Dorian Grey, A Tale of Two Cities, etc.")

Ford of the Hurdles 1928
Diarmuid agus Gráinne 1929
Where Stars Walk 1940
Dancing Shadows 1941
Ill Met by Moonlight 1946

Portrait of Miriam 1947
The Mountains Look Different 1948
Home for Christmas 1950
A Slipper for the Moon 1954
Saint Patrick 1955

One-man shows:
 The Importance of Being Oscar
 I Must Be Talking to my Friends issued as an LP argo RG493'
 Talking About YeatsBooks

 Put Money In Thy Purse Each Actor On His Ass Ceo Meala Lá Seaca Enter a Goldfish All For Hecuba Oícheanna Sidhe Lá agus Oíche Aisteoirí Faoi Dhá Sholas Theatre in Ireland Ireland Bláth agus Taibhse An Oscar of No Importance W.B.Yeats and his world, with Eavan Boland

Films
The British Film Institute lists eleven films in which Mac Liammóir took part.Henry VIII (Page) 1911Enoch Arden  1914The Little Minister  (Micah Dow) 1915Comin' Thro' the Rye  1916 Land of Her Fathers  1924Hamlet at Elsinore 1951

Othello  (Iago) 1951
Tom Jones  (Narrator) 1963
30 Is a Dangerous Age, Cynthia  (Irish storyteller) 1968
The Kremlin Letter  (Sweet Alice) 1970
What's the Matter with Helen?  (Hamilton Starr) 1971

Biographies and commemorations
Books about Mac Liammóir include Micheál Mac Liammóir: Designs & Illustrations 1917–1972, by Richard Pine and Orla Murphy (1973); Enter Certain Players: Edwards–MacLiammoir and the Gate 1928–1978, edited by Peter Luke (1978); a biography, The Importance of Being Micheál by Micheál Ó hAodha (1990) and The Boys: A Double Biography, by Christopher Fitz-Simon (1996).

In 1985, Orson Welles was the narrator for Two People... With One Pulse, a documentary film about Mac Liammoir and Edwards. To mark Mac Liammóir's centenary in 1999 the BBC commissioned a documentary, Dear Boy: The Story of Michéal Mac Liammóir, which included rare archive footage.

Mac Liammóir is the subject of the 1990 play The Importance of Being Micheál by John Keyes; Frank McGuinness's play 2008 "Gates of Gold" is inspired by Edwards and Mac Liammóir.

The annual Dublin Gay Theatre Festival presents the "Michéal Mac Liammóir Award for Outstanding performance by a male".

Notes, references and sources

Notes

References

Sources
 
 
 
 
 
 
 
 
 
Academic articles on Mac Liammóir available in open access regime

 Markus, Radvan. "Micheál mac Liammóir, the Irish Language, and the Idea of Freedom." Marguérite Corporaal and Ruud van den Beuken, eds. A Stage of Emancipation: Change and Progress at the Dublin Gate Theatre. Liverpool: Liverpool University Press, 2021, 113-131. 
 Dean, Joan Fitzpatrick, and Radvan Markus. "The Internationalist Dramaturgy of Hilton Edwards and Micheál mac Liammóir." Ondřej Pilný, Ruud van den Beuken, Ian R. Walsh, eds. Cultural Convergences: The Dublin Gate Theatre, 1928–1960. London: Palgrave Macmillan, 2021, 15-46.

External links 
 

1899 births
1978 deaths
20th-century Anglo-Irish people
20th-century English painters
20th-century English poets
20th-century Irish painters
English male painters
Irish male painters
Burials at St. Fintan's Cemetery, Sutton
English male film actors
English male stage actors
Impresarios
Irish dramatists and playwrights
Irish male film actors
Irish poets
Irish male stage actors
Irish male poets
Jacob's Award winners
Naturalised citizens of Ireland
20th-century English male actors
20th-century Irish male actors
English male dramatists and playwrights
20th-century Irish poets
20th-century English dramatists and playwrights
Male actors from London
Writers from London
English male poets
Irish LGBT writers
20th-century Irish male writers
20th-century English male writers
20th-century LGBT people
20th-century English male artists
20th-century Irish male artists